Nathan the Wise is a 1922 German silent historical film directed by Manfred Noa and starring Fritz Greiner, Carl de Vogt and Lia Eibenschütz. It is based on the 1779 play Nathan the Wise by Gotthold Ephraim Lessing. It was made by Bavaria Film at the Emelka Studios. The film provoked protests in Munich from far-right groups who felt it was too pro-Jewish.

In 2010 oud player and composer Rabih Abou-Khalil released a soundtrack composed for the film entitled Trouble in Jerusalem.

Plot
One of the main works of the Age of Enlightenment, it is a powerful plea for tolerance, humanity and freedom of opinion. Set in the age of the crusades, it deals with the relations between the three monotheistic religions. Characters include the historical figure of Sultan Saladin, and the Jewish merchant Nathan; the character of Nathan is based on Lessing's friend, the renowned philosopher Moses Mendelssohn. When the play was published in 1779, this was considered breaching a taboo.

Cast
 Fritz Greiner as Sultan Saladin
 Carl de Vogt as Assad of Filneck / Young Templar
 Lia Eibenschütz as Sittah
 Werner Krauss as Nathan
 Bella Muzsnay as Recha
 Margarete Kupfer as Daja
 Rudolf Lettinger as Brother Bonafides 
 Ferdinand Martini as Al-Hafi
 Ernst Schrumpf as the Patriarch of Jerusalem
 Max Schreck as the Great Master of the Order of the Templar
 Wolfgang von Schwindt as the Emir of Kurdistan
 Ernst Matray as the Sultan's jester

References

Bibliography

External links

1922 films
Films of the Weimar Republic
German silent feature films
Films directed by Manfred Noa
German films based on plays
Films set in Jerusalem
Films set in the 1190s
German black-and-white films
German historical drama films
1920s historical drama films
Bavaria Film films
Films shot at Bavaria Studios
1922 drama films
Silent historical drama films
1920s German films
1920s German-language films